Borzov is a Slavic masculine surname. Its feminine counterpart is Borzova. It may refer to:
Nike Borzov (born 1972), Russian singer and musician
Sergey Borzov (born 1981), Uzbekistani sprint canoer
Valeriy Borzov (born 1949), Soviet sprinter
Irina Borzova (born 1987), Russian acrobatic gymnast
Yuliya Borzova (born 1981), Uzbekistani sprint canoer, sister of Sergey Borzov

Russian-language surnames